Ur-Les Escaldes station (French: Gare d'Ur-Les Escaldes) is a French railway station in Ur, Occitanie, France. The station is on the Ligne de Cerdagne, a narrow gauge line at 1,000 mm (3 ft 3 3⁄8 in) with a third rail pickup at 750 V DC (3rd rail). The station is served by TER Occitanie (local) trains (known as Train Jaune) operated by the SNCF.

Train services
The following services currently call at Ur-Les Escaldes:
local service (TER Occitanie) Latour-de-Carol-Enveitg–Font-Romeu–Villefranche-Vernet-les-Bains

Gallery

See also 

 List of SNCF stations in Occitanie

References

Railway stations in Pyrénées-Orientales